Li Qing may refer to:

Li Qing (diver) (born 1972), female Chinese diver
Li Qing (artist) (born 1981), Chinese artist
Li Mao (715–775), formerly known as Li Qing, Imperial Prince of the Chinese Tang Dynasty